Chaat masala, also spelled chat masala, is a powder spice mix, or masala, originating from South Asia, typically used to add flavor to chaat. It typically consists of amchoor (dried mango powder), cumin, coriander, dried ginger, salt (often black salt), black pepper, asafoetida, and chili powder. Garam masala is optional.

Uses
Beyond its use in preparing chaat, chaat masala finds uses in Indian fruit salads made with papaya, sapodilla, apples and bananas. Chaat masala is also sprinkled on potatoes, fruit, egg toasts and regular salads in India.

Spice brands market an alternate spice mix called fruit chaat masala, which contains less cumin, coriander, and ginger, but more of chili pepper, black salt, amchoor and asafoetida. Street vendors usually mix their own chaat masala, which is sprinkled on chopped-up fruit or fresh vegetables (such as raw white radish in the northern regions of the Indian subcontinent). Sometimes black salt with chili powder alone is used.

References

Indian cuisine
Bengali cuisine
Bangladeshi cuisine
Pakistani cuisine
Indo-Caribbean cuisine
Masalas